Oleh Volodymyrovych Krasnopyorov (born 25 July 1980 in Poltava) is a Ukrainian football manager and former defender.

Career
He played for Metalist Kharkiv in the Ukrainian Premier League. He moved to Metalist Kharkiv from Vorskla Poltava in January 2013 during the 2012–13 winter transfer season.

Krasnopyorov has made one appearance for the Ukraine national football team, a friendly match against Norway on 19 November 2008 that only lasted 54 minutes.

External links

 Profile on Football Squads

1980 births
Living people
Sportspeople from Poltava
Ukrainian footballers
Ukraine international footballers
FC Vorskla Poltava players
FC Hoverla Uzhhorod players
FC Mariupol players
Ukrainian Premier League players
FC Dynamo-2 Kyiv players
FC Metalist Kharkiv players
Association football defenders
Ukrainian football managers
FSC Mariupol managers